George Leigh was an English politician.

George Leigh may also refer to:

George Leigh (motorcyclist), in 1953 Grand Prix motorcycle racing season
George Leigh, partner in predecessor of Sotheby's, as Baker & Leigh, 1767

See also
George Lee (disambiguation)
George Legh, British MP